Moriturus is a 1920 German silent crime film directed by Carl Hagen and starring Max Landa, Reinhold Schünzel and Conrad Veidt. It premiered at the Marmorhaus in Berlin.

The film's sets were designed by the art director Mathieu Oostermann.

Cast

References

Bibliography

External links

1920 films
Films of the Weimar Republic
German silent feature films
Films directed by Carl Hagen
German black-and-white films
1920 crime films
German crime films
Films based on German novels
1920s German films
1920s German-language films